The list of ship launches in 1982 includes a chronological list of all ships launched in 1982.


References

1982
Ship launches